The Isuzu Gemini is a subcompact car produced by the Japanese automaker Isuzu from 1974 until 2000. The same basic product was built and/or sold under several other names, sometimes by other General Motors brands, in various markets around the world. While the first generation was of a rear-wheel drive design, later versions were all front-wheel-drive, and the last two generations were no more than badge-engineered Honda Domani until the name was retired in 2000.



First generation (1974) 

The first Gemini was the Bellett Gemini, first seen in November 1974. It was based on the third-generation Opel Kadett C on the General Motors T-car platform and came in four-door sedan and two-door coupe body styles. The chassis code was PF50, although the later 1.8-liter versions were called PF60 and the diesels PFD60.

In June 1977 the Gemini received its first, light, facelift. The bigger 1817 cc G180 series engine became available, fitted with rectangular headlights rather than the round units used on the 1600. This model offered , although this output dropped to  if an automatic transmission was fitted. In November of the same year the 1600 was updated, now with square headlights and an engine with the I·CAS oxidation catalyst ("Isuzu Clean Air System") which could manage the 1978 emissions standards. One year later the Gemini 1800's engine was also upgraded to meet the 1978 emissions standards. Power remained unchanged, and the automatic now offered the same power as cars with manual transmission. The ignition system was now of a transistor less type, and the trunk lid was now opened remotely (not added to the Gemini 1600 until the end of December). The Gemini Black and 1800 Minx were also added, the Minx with a two-tone paintjob and the Black with black paintwork and more sporty yet comfortable equipment including alloy wheels.

In June 1979, the Gemini received a new slant nose with rectangular headlights and a redesigned rear end. The changes were actually more comprehensive than that, also including a redesigned (longer) engine bay and a wider radiator opening for two new engines added in November (the twin cam G180W and the new 4FB1 diesel) which both required wider radiators for more air for cooling.

In Japan, sports models were available originally with the "ZZ" name. Later, ZZ/L (1980), ZZ/R (1981), ZZ/T, and ZZ/E models were added. These were equipped with an Isuzu G180W 8-valve DOHC 1.8-liter engine, most commonly fuel-injected, producing  at 6400 rpm. These models also came with a shortened remote throw manual shift lever and optional factory LSD differential. There was also a mildly sporting model of the OHC 1800, called the LS/G.

In October 1982 a version of the diesel with Bosch VE electronic fuel injection was also added; this provided 8% more power than the regular version (66 versus 61 PS) and was fitted to the LT-E and LJ-E models. For those who wanted more, a  turbo diesel appeared a month later. Also featuring electronic fuel injection, this model also received a standard rear anti-roll bar. Counterintuitively, the two more powerful diesels were never available with the coupé bodywork.

The Gemini was complemented in 1981 by the Giugiaro-designed coupé Isuzu Piazza, based on the Gemini's platform, which was introduced in the United States in 1983 as the Isuzu Impulse and in Australia in 1986 as the Holden Piazza. After the front-wheel-drive second generation Gemini appeared in early 1985, the old rear-wheel drive version nonetheless continued to be built. The coupé model was discontinued, and a slimmed down sedan range (including the ZZ and diesel models) continued to be available. This diminished range was produced until February 1987, when the rear-wheel drive Gemini was laid to rest after 768,537 had been built.

In other markets

North America
The North American market version was originally sold as the "Opel by Isuzu" and then the Buick Opel (sometimes referred to as the "Buick Isuzu Opel"). It first appeared in late 1975, for the 1976 model year, and replaced the German-built Kadett which had become too expensive as a result of the weakening dollar and rising costs in Germany. Road & Track decried the switch, stating that the Isuzu felt "built to a price" and that unlike the real Opel, it was "one of our least favorite cars." In 1978 a "Sports Coupé" was added to the lineup, its changes being limited to the paint, different steel wheels, sporty mirrors, and a spoiler. For 1979 the car received a light cosmetic update with ribbed velour trim, a few new paint options, and rectangular headlights.

18,801 model year 1978 Buick Opels were sold, followed by 17,564 in 1979. In the middle of the calendar year the model was dropped, but supplies lasted long enough for another 950 cars to be sold during 1980.

For the 1981 model year, the "Buick Opel" metamorphosed into the "Isuzu I-Mark". The diesel had a claimed  (SAE net) at an unusually high 5,000 rpm. The I-Mark was offered with four-door sedan or two-door coupé bodywork with either engine, in Deluxe or fully equipped LS (added for the 1982 model year) trim. A 5-speed manual or a 3-speed automatic were on offer. There was also a base diesel-engined coupé on offer, with a 4-speed manual transmission only. The diesel gradually lost sales after USA's brief love affair with the diesel car came to an end in the early eighties, and eventually it was only available in a single coupé version. For 1985, the rear-wheel-drive I-Mark's last year, only the Deluxe sedan version with the gasoline engine remained available.

Australia
In addition to sedan and coupé models, Holden in Australia produced the Gemini as a three-door station wagon and three-door panel van, which were derived from the Opel Kadett C Caravan and Vauxhall Chevette wagon, with Isuzu Gemini front panels. The panel van's side panels came from the Bedford Chevanne. The Australian Holden Gemini was fitted with an Isuzu G161Z petrol engine, although 1979 and later models were available with a 1.8-litre 8-valve SOHC diesel engine (4FB1). The more common G161Z was a 1.6-liter 8-valve SOHC fed by a Nikki carburettor. The Holden Gemini was Wheels magazine's Car of the Year for 1975.

Other markets
In Europe, the Gemini was equipped with the 1.6-liter engine which produced  DIN there; the discrepancy in stated power (down 32 percent) may have been entirely due to the differences to the SAE (gross) measuring system used on Japanese market cars.

Isuzu Gemini was also sold in South Korea as the Saehan Gemini, whose manufacturer became Daewoo Motors in 1982. It then became Daewoo Maepsy after 1982 and remained on sale (later as the Maepsy-Na after a facelift) until it was replaced by the Daewoo LeMans in 1986. It continued to be assembled as a taxi model called Maepsy Sigma until 1989.

Sold as:
 1975–1984 - Holden Gemini - Australia, New Zealand (sold from 1977 to 1984, initially badged as an Isuzu in NZ, as the brand had already been established by the earlier Bellett; early Australian cars from 1975 launch were badged Holden-Isuzu), Indonesia
 1975–1983 - Opel Gemini - Malaysia, Thailand
 1976–1979 - Opel Isuzu/Buick Opel - United States
 1977–1982 - Saehan Gemini - South Korea ("Saehan Bird" in the export)
 1982–1986 - Saehan/Daewoo Maepsy/Maepsy-Na/Maepsy Sigma - South Korea
 1982–1988 - Saehan/Daewoo Max - pickup version, South Korea
 1981–1984 - Isuzu I-Mark - North America

Second generation (1985)

General Motors sought a replacement for their world car T-body Kadett / Gemini, and this time, instead of building one design on several continents, they decided to build a world car in one location and export it to several continents. As a considerable portion of the T-body manufacturing had been turned over to Isuzu in Japan for economic reasons, so would the manufacturing of the replacement. In 1984, Isuzu again commissioned Giorgetto Giugiaro who was responsible for the 117 Coupé and the Piazza. This time, he was to design an economy car on the new front-wheel drive R-body platform. The R-body featured a MacPherson strut front suspension and beam axle rear suspension, which foreshadowed most of GM's offerings through their current model lineup. Giugiaro's design followed the Piazza design very closely in shape and detail, though the proportions made the Gemini appear shorter and taller in its three-door version, and a four-door sedan (notch back) was also designed.

Unfortunately for everyone involved, Isuzu presented the designs to GM prior to freezing them, and GM ordered a number of detail changes to them without ever consulting the designer, Giugiaro, which was taken as an insult, and ended the long relationship between the noted Italian designer and Japan's second oldest car builder. The insult was serious enough to Giugiaro that he denied the design was his until a decade after the vehicle went out of production.

The R-body Gemini was introduced in May 1985 as the Gemini FF (after it had already gone on sale as a Chevrolet in the United States), with an all-new line of engines. In Japan, originally with chassis code JT150, it was available with a carburetted 1.5-liter SOHC engine. An also newly developed 1.5-liter inline four diesel engine (JT600) was added to the lineup in November. At the other end of the lineup, a  fuel-injected and turbocharged version of the 1.5-liter 4XB1 engine ("Irmscher") was added in May 1986. Originally, the transmission started out with a choice of a 5-speed manual or a 3-speed automatic, but NAVi5, an automated manual transmission, was added in 1986.

The FF Gemini underwent a facelift in February 1987, receiving a more aggressive front styling with wraparound headlight as well as other minor changes. At the same time, the "FF" moniker was dropped, as parallel production of the preceding RWD Gemini came to an end. In March 1987 the Gemini saw its European premiere, at the Geneva Salon. European sales of the already somewhat dated Gemini were disappointing, and Isuzu soon withdrew from the European passenger car market entirely.

Export versions were also available with a smaller 1.3-liter four to suit taxation systems based on displacement. This offered , while export specification 1.5s had  on tap and the naturally aspirated diesel offered  outside Japan. Trim levels were widely varied, from basic models ("C/C" in Japan, "LT" in general export markets, and "S" in the US) to Irmscher, ZZ, and Lotus Tuned versions, and plenty of optional equipment and dealer options were available.

A second minor change was released in February 1989 for Japan only. The position of the rear license plate garnish for the sedan model has been moved from the trunk lid to the center part of the bumper. Other differences include the amber turn indicators lens now having been dropped, and an addition of side marker lights. In total, 748,216 second generation Geminis (under all nameplates) were built. 150,873 of these were sold as Isuzu I-Marks in the United States, while 363,171 were sold under the Chevrolet and Geo badges.

North America
In the US, the vehicle was available from Chevrolet (and as a Geo beginning in mid-1988) as the Spectrum, or from Isuzu themselves, as the I-Mark. GM's Pontiac division sold the I-Mark as the Pontiac Sunburst in Canada from 1985 to 1988. Sales were limited to coastal markets initially, as import quotas restricted the number of cars General Motors could sell in the United States. The Spectrum was presented at the end of November 1984, with cars initially going on sale in 16 eastern states. Isuzu's own I-Mark went on sale during the 1985 model year. Due to the quotas, only 29,500 cars were available the first model year, about a quarter of what GM had hoped to be able to sell.

The introductory model years featured a unique eggcrate grille flanked by single square sealed-beam headlights, but for 1987 the Spectrum (and I-Mark) received the restyled front end with "cat's eyes" headlights and 5-mph bumpers. The interior was also revamped, and the  Spectrum Turbo was added to the lineup. Isuzu's turbocharged version, dubbed RS, was a later introduction, arriving early in calendar year 1987. The Spectrum Turbo was only available as a four-door sedan, while the I-Mark RS was only available as a hatchback.

US sales of the Isuzu I-Mark were down by half for the latter half of 1989, as a lengthy changeover to the new models slowed down production in Japan. Isuzu was contractually obliged to supply a certain number of Geo Spectrums, meaning that there were very few I-Marks available for Isuzu's own dealers. With a delayed introduction of the upcoming Stylus (third generation Gemini), Isuzu largely abandoned the passenger car segment for nearly a year, selling mostly leftover stock of the old Impulse.

GM Canada replaced the Sunburst with the Passport Optima in 1989. For GM, this was an entry-level vehicle to attract young buyers and to compete with Japanese midsize cars in the US market. Chevrolet's Spectrum lacked many of the options and equipment of the I-Mark, although with the exception of a brief run of decontented hatchbacks in 1988 dubbed "Spectrum Express" they were not as austere as the base trim levels of contemporary Dodge Colt, Toyota Tercel and Honda Civics. Both the Chevrolet and the Isuzu were available with the  1.5-liter SOHC non-turbo and  turbo engines, but neither diesel engines nor NAVi5 were offered in the US. The turbocharged I-Mark was called the RS model in 1988 and then changed to the LS model in 1989. The I-Mark was available with the  1.6-liter DOHC engine in 1989 only, as the RS model. In 1988 and 1989, the LS and RS models were offered with Lotus Tuned Suspension, the sportier suspension featuring more rigid dampers, alternate spring rates, and bigger sway bars.

For 1988, the Chevrolet Spectrum was available as the base model, with a better equipped LS package, or as the Turbo Sedan. There was also a Spectrum Sport Coupe package (hatchback only) on offer, using the standard engine combined with some of the Turbo's equipment, such as a sporty steering wheel, different rear view mirrors, a rear spoiler, fully body colored exterior (grille, bumpers, door handles, etcetera), and the uprated F41 suspension. The 1989 Geo Spectrum (introduced in June 1988 as an early 1989 model year) was only available with the naturally aspirated 1.5-liter engine in a single equipment level, with either the three-door hatchback or four-door sedan bodywork.

Sold as:
 1985–1989 Isuzu I-Mark - United States, Canada
 1985–1990 Isuzu Gemini - Japan, Europe, and Central America
 1984–1988 Chevrolet Spectrum - United States & Canada
 1988–1989 Geo Spectrum - United States
 1985–1989 Pontiac Sunburst - Canada
 1985–1990 Holden Gemini - Australia, New Zealand and Indonesia
 1985–1990 Chevrolet Gemini - Chile and Argentina

Third generation (1990)

The Gemini was redesigned for 1990, and the coupé version was now renamed the Gemini Coupé. The last models were produced in June 1993. The third generation sedan appeared in March 1990. Body size was wider than the previous generation. A liftback coupé was introduced in September 1990, with the three-door hatchback version added in March 1991. The last of the Isuzu-developed Geminis and its derivatives were sold as the Isuzu Impulse, Isuzu Piazza, Isuzu Gemini, Isuzu Stylus, Geo Storm, and Asüna Sunfire.

The Isuzu Gemini Coupé was the basis for the Isuzu Impulse and Geo Storm in the United States and Canada, and for the Asüna Sunfire which was sold in the Canadian market for the 1993 model year only. The Geo versions lacked some of the more expensive and advanced features of the Isuzu (and Asüna) versions. The 4-door sedan was sold as the Isuzu Stylus in the United States and Canada.

Model codes were JT151F for the front-wheel drive 1.5/1.6-litre gasoline versions, JT191F for the front-wheel drive 1600 DOHC model, and JT191S for the four-wheel drive, turbocharged "Irmscher R" version. Turbodiesels are JT641F/JT641S for front-wheel drive and four-wheel drive models respectively.

In North America, the base Stylus "S" model received a  1.6 L SOHC version of the 4XE1, available in 5-speed manual or 3-speed automatic transmissions. The 1990 and 1991 top-line Stylus "XS" models had a  4XE1-UW 1.6 L naturally aspirated DOHC engine only available with a 5-speed manual transmission when introduced, and received the 4XF1  1.8 L naturally aspirated DOHC engine with the 5-speed manual in its final 1992 model year. The Stylus initially was offered in two trim levels in 1990 and 1991, the base Stylus "S" with a 1.6 L SOHC 12-valve 4XE1 engine, and the top-level "XS" with the DOHC engine and the Lotus-tuned suspension. The XS also offered an optional power equipment package, which included power windows, power door locks, power mirrors, and a sunroof. This XS "Power Package" would evolve into the 1.8 L "RS" trim level for 1992, slotting above the "XS" trim for 1992. The DOHC Stylus (both "XS" and "RS") would be dropped after 1992, leaving the lone SOHC "S" trim for the final 1993 model year to stand alongside the Geo Storm platform triplet. The third platform triplet, the Impulse, would also be withdrawn after 1992 and was sold in Canada for 1993 only as the Asüna Sunfire, as Isuzu was preparing its passenger car exit from the US market in July 1993.

The higher trim level packages offered "ZZ handling by Lotus" and "specification Irmscher" as the performance models in the lineup, but was carryovered from previous generations. The top model was the "Irmscher-R" JT191S type, equipped with a high-power turbocharged engine and full-time 4WD. The suspension packages that were installed on the second generation Isuzu Piazza were also shared on the Gemini sold in Japan, including the four-wheel steering setup.

North American sales of the sedan started from December 1990 under the name Isuzu Stylus. Initial orders were above target in Japan, but production lagged behind. Strong early sales began to slump within a year, however, and as the post-bubble recession began to take hold in Japan, Isuzu was particularly affected. After a corporate restructuring, Isuzu decided to abandon passenger car production and focus on commercial truck and SUV production, as the Trooper and the Rodeo found many buyers internationally, with badge engineered versions sold under a variety of brands and names across different markets.

The total production volume of vehicles was 406,625 units at the end of the third generation (from HQ Isuzu), with 17,754 units sold in the United States (from Ward's Automotive Yearbook).

Fourth generation (1993)

Isuzu halted production of the Gemini and replaced it with a rebadged version of the Honda Domani. It was only available with the four-door sedan bodystyle and a limited number of engines; the Domani also came as a five-door hatchback.

Fifth generation (1997)

The fifth generation Gemini was a rebadged second generation Honda Domani sedan, a car which was also marketed as a Civic in Europe. Production of this model ceased in 2000. As usual, the Gemini was available in a much more limited lineup than that of the related Honda version, with only one bodystyle and either a 1.5 or a 1.6 litre engine.

Safety
In Australia, the 1982–1984 Holden Gemini was assessed in the Used Car Safety Ratings 2006 as providing "significantly worse than average" protection for its occupants in the event of a crash.

Related information
The first and second generation Isuzu Geminis, specifically the diesel ones, were the most popular taxicab models in the Philippines in the 1980s and early 1990s. Models were phased out and gradually replaced with newer models from Toyota and Nissan.

The Singapore Police Force used the Isuzu Gemini Fast Response Cars (FRCs) from 1991 until 1995 until they were phased out and replaced by the Subaru Impreza police cars.

The front-wheel drive Geminis (second and third generation) were marketed in Japan with the catch phrase , and television commercials featuring exciting driving stunts throughout the streets of Paris. With French professional stunt driver Rèmy Julienne mostly coordinating with all of the stunts, the Geminis enjoyed wide popularity.

References

External links

 Development of the Isuzu Gemini from GM
 Isuzu Official Gemini article (Japanese)
 OzGemini.com
 HoldenGemini.net
 CanberraGeminiClub.com
 GemiSA Car Club (previously Just Gems of SA)
 Used Car Safety Ratings - Holden Gemini - Australia Only
 ISUZU Gemini Ads

Gemini
Front-wheel-drive vehicles
Rear-wheel-drive vehicles
Subcompact cars
Compact cars
Police vehicles
Coupés
Hatchbacks
Sedans
Cars introduced in 1974
1980s cars
1990s cars
2000s cars
Touring cars
Spectrum